Mona Anette Lindgren Jansson, known as Nettan Lindgren Jansson (born 13 March 1957, in Grödinge) is a Swedish auto racing driver. She is the first and only female driver to win a race in the British Touring Car Championship, when she won her class with a BMW M3 at Thruxton. She is currently racing in Trofeo Abarth 500 Scandinavia and works as a racing manager for her daughter, Caroline.

Racing career
She started racing in 1973 with karting, before moving on to Swedish Formula Ford. In 1980 she competed in the Swedish Sports 2000 Championship. From 1981 she raced in both the Swedish and Finnish Formula 3 Championship. She was Lancia Ladies Cup Winner between 1985 and 1988.

She competed in the BTCC for three seasons between 1989 and 1991, all in a BMW M3. Despite being the only female class winner, possibly her best known moment came in 1991. On-board TV cameras caught her giving Jonathan Palmer (present Snetterton owner and at the time fellow BMW driver), a strong verbal telling off when she caught up with his stranded car, after he had punted her car off the track when the cars collided at Snetterton. After her time in the BTCC she continued in Touring Cars with the Swedish Touring Car Championship.

Racing record

Complete British Touring Car Championship results
(key) (Races in bold indicate pole position in class) (Races in italics indicate fastest lap in class - 1 point awarded all races)

References

External links
 Profile at BTCC Pages.

Swedish racing drivers
British Touring Car Championship drivers
1957 births
Living people
Swedish Touring Car Championship drivers
Swedish female racing drivers